DXBN (792 AM) Radyo Pilipinas is a radio station owned and operated by the Philippine Broadcasting Service. The station's studio is located at the City Hall Complex, Brgy. Doongan, Butuan. DXBN is the first station to undergo studio & equipment rehabilitation through Radio Rehab program.

References

Radio stations in Butuan
Radio stations established in 1990
Philippine Broadcasting Service